Neville Leon Denton (22 July 1934 – 27 March 2015)  was a New Zealand rugby league player who represented New Zealand in the 1954 and 1960 World Cup.

Playing career
Denton, an Auckland representative, played in 13 test matches for the New Zealand national rugby league team between 1954 and 1963. During this time Denton attended the 1954, 1957 and 1960 World Cups. However he did not play a match in the 1957 World Cup. Denton was also part of the Auckland teams that defeated France 15–8 in 1960, Australia 13–8 in 1961 and Great Britain 46–13 in 1962.

Denton, along with Ron Ackland and Gary Phillips, withdrew from the 1961 tour of Great Britain due to a dispute over allowances. He played for the "Northern Districts" team during the Auckland Rugby League's "district era". The team was a combination of Northcote Tigers and North Shore Albions. He also played for Marist.

Coaching career
Denton coached Marist in 1965 and 1966 and also coached Mangere East. Denton later served as the selector-coach of Auckland between 1971 and 1973.

Later years
Denton died on 27 March 2015, aged 80, at his Paparimu, Auckland residence.

References

1934 births
2015 deaths
Place of birth missing
New Zealand rugby league administrators
New Zealand rugby league players
New Zealand national rugby league team players
Auckland rugby league team players
Rugby league wingers
New Zealand rugby league coaches
Marist Saints coaches
Auckland rugby league team coaches
Mangere East Hawks coaches